The Red Eureka Movement (REM) was an Australian communist party led by activist Albert Langer. It was active from 1977 to 1982. The party was formed as a splinter organization from the Communist Party of Australia (Marxist–Leninist) (CPAML) by activists who supported the Gang of Four against Deng Xiaoping. The group denounced China under Xiaoping as having taken the "capitalist road". The group was opposed to all other Australian Maoist organisations for a variety of reasons, and advocated for a global front to oppose the Soviet Union.

REM was based in Melbourne, and published a monthly journal titled Rebel, as well as another journal titled Discussion Bulletin, which published material that satirised the CPAML. The REM owned a bookstore named the "After Hours Bookstore" in Hoddle Street, Melbourne.

References 

Communist parties in Australia
Anti-revisionist organizations
Stalinist parties
Defunct Maoist parties
Far-left politics in Australia
Organizations established in 1977